Glebe Park may refer to:

Glebe Park, Brechin, a football stadium in Brechin, Scotland
Glebe Park, Canberra, a public park in Canberra, Australia

See also
Glebe, area of land within a manor and parish